Pray for Me, Paul Henderson is a Canadian television comedy-drama film, directed by Brad Turner and broadcast by CBC Television in 1989. Set in 1972 against the backdrop of the Canada-USSR Summit Series, the film centres on four high school students — nerdy overachiever Cameron Alexander (Torquil Campbell), his best friend Russell (Richard Chevolleau), poetry-loving hippie Cynthia Maclean (Samantha Follows) and football jock Michael Starnoulis (Yannick Bisson) — who come together to compete as the school team in Reach for the Top and become heroes of their school as they reach the national finals against all odds.

CBC journalist Jan Tennant, who had been an announcer for the real Reach for the Top in the early 1970s, reprised her role in the film.

The film aired on November 5, 1989 as an episode of CBC's Magic Hour anthology of youth and family television films.

Hester Riches of the Vancouver Sun praised the film, opining that CBC should consider turning it into a series and concluding that "we might have a Canadian Wonder Years on our hands".

Awards

References

External links

1989 films
1989 television films
1989 in Canadian television
1980s high school films
CBC Television original films
English-language Canadian films
Films directed by Brad Turner
Films set in 1972
Canadian comedy television films
Canadian drama television films
1980s Canadian films